Dan Lukacinsky is a singer and musician who provided vocals and guitar for the Suicide Machines. He now plays guitar and sings in Kick Like Kato. He's also been working as a producer for other bands and has been selling guitars for a living. He grew up in Detroit, Michigan and is currently living in Japan. He's been on Warped Tour and has been part of the music business for years. Over the summer of 2006, he worked as a counselor (or producer) at a camp, Power Chord Academy, in Queens, New York, that helps young musicians get to where they want to be in the music world.

Dan is currently playing in a Japanese hardcore/punk band called The One Thought Moment.  The band includes Dan (guitar/vocals), Mas (guitar/vocals), Satoshi (bass/vocals) and Yoshi (drums).  They are currently on the Japanese record label Inyaface Records.  Their debut performance was December 23, 2007 at Shinjuku ACB Hall.

References

External links
Dan Lukacinsky on Myspace

Year of birth missing (living people)
Living people
Singers from Detroit